Marie-Aimée Roger-Miclos (May 1, 1860 – May 19, 1951) was a French pianist.

Early life
Marie-Aimée Miclos was born in Toulouse.

Career
Several composers dedicated compositions to Roger-Miclos. Joseph O'Kelly dedicated a piano work to Roger-Miclos in 1884. Camille Saint-Saëns dedicated a piano piece to Roger-Miclos, which she premiered in 1891.

Roger-Miclos played in London in 1890 and 1894. She toured German-speaking cities in 1893, 1894, and 1897. She toured in the United States and Canada in the 1902–1903 season. "She comes from Southern France, the land of fire and passion, and is an artist of interesting and unconventional qualities, possessing a strongly marked sense of rhythm, brilliant and incisive touch, and her playing is marked with certainty, that adds tonal charm to brilliancy," observed one reviewer, adding "As a pianiste she is an artistic diplomat." In 1905, she made recordings of Mendelssohn and Chopin works.

She also taught piano, at the Paris Conservatoire. American painter George Da Maduro Peixotto made a portrait of her in 1893. She was also the subject of a medal made by French artist , exhibited in 1909.

Personal life
Marie-Aimée Roger-Miclos married twice. Her first husband, Roger, was a railroad inspector; they married in 1881, and he died in 1887. Her second husband was fellow musician Louis-Charles Battaille, the son of Charles-Amable Battaille; they married in 1905, and he died in 1937. She died in Paris in 1951, aged 91 years.

References

External links

1860 births
1951 deaths
19th-century French women classical pianists
20th-century French women classical pianists
Musicians from Toulouse
Conservatoire de Paris alumni
Academic staff of the Conservatoire de Paris